Hord's Ridge, Texas is a former community in Dallas County, Texas, which later became part of  Oak Cliff.

References

Neighborhoods in Oak Cliff, Dallas
Populated places in Dallas County, Texas